With v O’Flanagan [1936] Ch 575 is an English contract law case, concerning misrepresentation. It holds that there is a duty to disclose material changes in circumstances that were represented to be true in negotiations.

Facts
Dr O’Flanagan said truthfully in January 1934 that his medical practice had takings of £2000 pa. However, in May the takings were only £5 a week because O’Flanagan had become ill. The contract was signed with Mr With to buy the medical practice, but Mr O'Flanagan did not disclose the change in circumstances.

At trial the judge held that because the contract was not made uberrimae fidei.
Where a statement is rendered false by a change in circumstances there is a duty to disclose the change. A failure to do so will result in an actionable misrepresentation

Judgment
Lord Wright MR held that Mr With could rescind either because there was a duty to point out the change in circumstance or because the representation continued till the point when the contract was signed. He referred to Fry J in Davies v London Provincial Marine Insurance that there is no duty to disclose, even when someone believes facts to be operating on another’s mind. He noted fiduciary relationships can bring an entire duty of disclosure. Uberrimae fidei contracts, including partnership and marine insurance, do too. But also where in negotiations a statement is false and then the representor discovers it, though if he had said nothing he is entitled to hold his tongue throughout. He noted that a ‘representation made as a matter of inducement to enter a contract is to be treated as a continuing representation.’

Romer LJ stated,

Clauson J concurred.

Significance
This affirms a general principle that any change to a fundamental reason for contracting (supervening falsification) must be communicated, where it is known to one party. It does not matter what the reason or motive is for not communicating is, it need not be malicious or fraudulent, but merely known to the representor.

See also

English contract law
Misrepresentation in English law
Brownlie v Campbell 5 AC 925, 950, Lord Blackburn,
"when a statement or representation has been made in the bonâ fide belief that it is true, and the party who has made it afterwards comes to find out that it is untrue, and discovers what he should have said, he can no longer honestly keep up that silence on the subject after that has come to his knowledge, thereby allowing the other party to go on, and still more, inducing him to go on, upon a statement which was honestly made at the time when it was made, but which he has not now retracted when he has become aware that it can be no longer honestly persevered in."

Notes

References
R Bigwood, 'Pre-contractual misrepresentation and the limits of the principle in With v O'Flanagan' (2005) 64(1) Cambridge Law Journal 96

English misrepresentation case law
Court of Appeal (England and Wales) cases
1936 in case law
1936 in England
1936 in British law